Frank White Jr. (born September 4, 1950) is an American politician and former professional baseball player, who spent 18 years with the Kansas City Royals of Major League Baseball (MLB). After his playing career, he has worked as a professional baseball coach and sports commentator, and has been elected to public office in Jackson County, Missouri.

Early years
White was born in Greenville, Mississippi. After attending Longview Community College in Lee's Summit, Missouri, he rose through Minor League Baseball to reach the big leagues. Within the Royals' farm system, he played for the rookie league Gulf Coast League Royals (1971), Class A San Jose Bees (1972), Class AA Jacksonville Suns (1972), and Class AAA Omaha Royals (1973).

Playing career
White is one of only three MLB players, along with Ron Washington and U L Washington, who were products of the Royals Academy. Though initially disliked by Kansas City fans because he displaced the popular Cookie Rojas at second base, he went on to set a major-league record jointly with teammate George Brett, by appearing in 1,914 games together. The record stood until 1995, when it was broken by the Detroit Tigers' Alan Trammell and Lou Whitaker.

A smooth fielder, White was a five-time All-Star. He won the Gold Glove Award eight times, including six consecutive seasons from 1977 to 1982. In 1977, he played 62 consecutive errorless games. In 1980, White was awarded the inaugural American League Championship Series MVP award in the 1980 ALCS against the New York Yankees, leading the Royals to their first World Series appearance.

Although in his early years he was a singles hitter who contributed little to the Royals' run column, White improved markedly as an offensive player during his career, hitting 22 home runs two years in a row, in 1985 and 1986. Since the 1985 World Series was played without the designated hitter, White hit cleanup during that series, in place of Hal McRae.  Until White, the only other second baseman to hit cleanup in a World Series was Jackie Robinson.  In the 1986 Major League Baseball All-Star Game, his solo home run in the seventh off Mike Scott was the deciding run in a 3–2 American League victory.

White retired as a player in 1990, after 18 seasons with Kansas City, having played 2324 regular season games with a .255 average, 160 home runs and 886 RBIs. Defensively, White posted a .984 fielding percentage at second base and .983 fielding percentage overall. He also hit for the cycle twice in his major league career, on September 26, 1979 in a 4–0 victory over the California Angels and on August 3, 1982 in a 6–5 win over the Detroit Tigers.

Post-playing career

Coaching and front office
After the end of White's playing career, he was a first base coach with both the Boston Red Sox from 1994 to 1996, and with the Kansas City Royals from 1997 to 2001, wearing uniform number 20 for both teams. He then managed the Wichita Wranglers for three years before moving to Kansas City's front office.  White was mentioned as a possible candidate for Royals' general manager Dayton Moore to consider as the successor to manager Buddy Bell after the 2007 season; the job ultimately went to Trey Hillman. White resigned his position in the front office in January 2011.

White is currently on the coaching staff of the Kansas City Monarchs in the American Association of Independent Professional Baseball.

Broadcasting
In February 2008, it was announced that White was joining FSN Kansas City to serve as a part-time color commentator on Royals telecasts (filling in for Paul Splittorff on select games), as well as an analyst on the channel's Royals Live postgame show.

FSN Kansas City announced in early December 2011 that White's broadcasting contract wouldn’t be renewed as the Royals' television color commentator.

Politics
White ran for the Jackson County Legislature in 2014 as a Democrat, winning election of an at-large seat.

On January 11, 2016, White was appointed county executive by the Jackson County Legislature, for the remainder of 2016 following the resignation of Mike Sanders. In November 2016, White was elected to the same position, for a two-year term.

Honors

White was inducted into the Missouri Sports Hall of Fame in 1994. On Sunday July 2, 1995, the Royals retired White's number 20, and the same year he was inducted into the Royals' Hall of Fame.  A bronze statue of White was dedicated outside of Kauffman Stadium in 2004, joining Royals founders Ewing & Muriel Kauffman, George Brett, and as of 2009, Dick Howser.

See also
List of American professional sports figures who held elective office
List of Major League Baseball career hits leaders
List of Major League Baseball career doubles leaders
List of Major League Baseball career stolen bases leaders
List of Major League Baseball players who spent their entire career with one franchise
List of Major League Baseball players to hit for the cycle

References

Further reading

External links
, or Retrosheet
 Biography at website of Jackson County, Missouri

 

1950 births
Living people
African-American baseball coaches
African-American baseball players
Águilas del Zulia players
American League All-Stars
American League Championship Series MVPs
Baseball players from Kansas City, Missouri
Baseball players from Mississippi
Boston Red Sox coaches
Gold Glove Award winners
Gulf Coast Royals players
Jacksonville Suns players
Kansas City Royals announcers
Kansas City Royals coaches
Kansas City Royals players
Leones del Caracas players
American expatriate baseball players in Venezuela
Major League Baseball broadcasters
Minor league baseball managers
Major League Baseball players with retired numbers
Major League Baseball second basemen
Missouri Democrats
Omaha Royals players
Sportspeople from Greenville, Mississippi
San Jose Bees players
Silver Slugger Award winners
American sportsmen
Minor league baseball coaches
County executives of Jackson County, Missouri
21st-century African-American people
20th-century African-American sportspeople